"I Saw A Man and He Danced With His Wife" is the third single released by American singer/actress Cher from her 11th studio album Dark Lady. It reached #42 on the Billboard Hot 100 and #3 on the Adult Contemporary chart.

Weekly charts

References

Songs about dancing
Cher songs